Michal Horňák (born 28 April 1970 in Vsetín) is a Czech football manager and former player. He played for the Czech Republic, for which he played 38 matches and scored 1 goal.

Horňák played for several clubs, including TJ Gottwaldov, RH Cheb, Sparta Prague (most of his career) and LASK Linz (Austria).

He was a participant in the UEFA Euro 1996, where the Czech Republic won the silver medal.

He later was the assistant coach in the Czech club FK Teplice. He took over as manager of Vlašim in April 2013, but only stayed until the end of the calendar year before being replaced by Vlastimil Petržela.

References

External links 
 

Living people
1970 births
People from Vsetín
Association football defenders
Czechoslovak footballers
Czech footballers
UEFA Euro 1996 players
1997 FIFA Confederations Cup players
Czech Republic international footballers
AC Sparta Prague players
FK Hvězda Cheb players
LASK players
SFC Opava players
SV Horn players
Czech First League players
Czech expatriate footballers
Expatriate footballers in Austria
Czech football managers
FC Sellier & Bellot Vlašim managers
FK Čáslav managers
AC Sparta Prague managers
Sportspeople from the Zlín Region
Czech National Football League managers
FK Viktoria Žižkov players
Bohemian Football League managers